William Thomas Danoff (born May 7, 1946) is an American songwriter and singer. He is known for “Afternoon Delight", which he wrote and performed as a member of the Starland Vocal Band, and for writing multiple hits for John Denver, including "Take Me Home, Country Roads".

Early life and education
Danoff is a graduate of Cathedral High School in Springfield, Massachusetts, and of Georgetown University.

Career

Starland Vocal Band
On the strength of their track record as songwriters, Danoff and Taffy Nivert recorded several albums before forming the Starland Vocal Band with local musicians Jon Carroll and Margot Chapman. The group recorded "Afternoon Delight" which became a hit in July 1976, reaching #1 on the Hot 100 on July 10. The Starland Vocal Band Show replaced Rhoda as a half-hour weekly series that same summer. Danoff and Nivert also worked with director Robert Altman and producer Jerry Weintraub on the film Nashville, doing research with screenwriter Joan Tewkesbury.

Songwriting
Danoff and his then-wife Taffy Nivert wrote "I Guess He'd Rather Be in Colorado" and "Take Me Home, Country Roads," both of which were hits for John Denver. "Take Me Home, Country Roads" is an official state song of West Virginia. Danoff has stated he had never been in West Virginia before co-writing the song, having written it in a house in the Georgetown neighborhood of Washington, D.C. He had even briefly considered using "Massachusetts" rather than "West Virginia", as both four-syllable state names would have fit the song's meter. Denver recorded about a dozen Danoff compositions from 1972 through the end of his career.

Danoff also worked with Emmylou Harris, co-authoring "Boulder to Birmingham" (one of Harris' better-known compositions). This track was recorded by The Walker Brothers in 1975 and The Hollies in 1976, and became a Top 10 hit in New Zealand. In 1982, Danoff and fellow Starland Vocal Band member Jon Carroll wrote "Who Knows How To Make Love Stay", a Top 40 Canadian hit for Doug and the Slugs.

Danoff taught a songwriters course in 2007 and a music industry seminar (with Walter Egan) in 2008 at his alma mater Georgetown University.

Personal life
Danoff married Taffy Nivert in 1972. Both were part of the Starland Vocal Band; they divorced after the band’s breakup in 1981.

Danoff has three children: two daughters and a son, Owen, who auditioned for The Voice season 10.

Discography
Albums
Fat City
 Reincarnation (ABC, 1969)
 Welcome To Fat City (Paramount, 1971)
John Denver with Bill Danoff - Taffy Nivert
 Victory Is Peace (Tomorrow Entertainment ER-7209-LP, 1972) 
Bill & Taffy
 Pass It On (RCA, 1973)
 Aces (RCA, 1974)
Starland Vocal Band
 Five albums; details at SVB page
Bill Danoff
 Souvenir (Watch Your Head, 1990)
 I Guess He'd Rather Be In Colorado (Watch Your Head, 2002)
 Blasted In The Basement (Oasis, 2007)
Singles
John Denver with Fat City
 "Take Me Home, Country Roads" / "Poems, Prayers And Promises" (RCA, 1971)
Bill & Taffy
 "Pass It On" / "Didn't I Try" (RCA UK, 1973)
 "Maybe" / "How Lucky Can You Be" (RCA Germany, 1974)
 "Maybe" (stereo) / "Maybe" (mono) (RCA promo, 1974)
Starland Vocal Band
 Ten singles; details at SVB page
Appearances
 Capital Acoustics: Contemporary & Traditional Folk Music of the Washington DC Area (Institute of Musical Traditions, 1991), "Trying To Live In Time"
 The 8th Annual World Folk Music Association Benefit Concert (World Folk Music Association, 1993), "Potter's Wheel"
 Jon Carroll and Love Returns at the Barns at Wolf Trap (FestivaLink, 2007, Internet release), "Blasted In The Basement"

References

External links
Official website
[ Billboard biography]

1946 births
Living people
American male singers
Grammy Award winners
Songwriters from Massachusetts
Musicians from Springfield, Massachusetts
American people of Bulgarian descent
Singers from Massachusetts
American male songwriters
Starland Vocal Band members